Juan Manuel García (born 8 July 1988) is an Argentine professional footballer who plays as a goalkeeper for the Deportes Santa Cruz.

Career
García's first club were Rosario Central, he was promoted into the first-team during the 2010–11 Primera B Nacional when he was an unused substitute away to Defensa y Justicia on 19 June 2011. In the following season, 2011–12, García made twenty-four appearances including his pro debut on 25 September 2011 versus Boca Unidos. However, in the next five seasons, he featured just eighteen times. In June 2016, García was loaned to Gimnasia y Esgrima of the Argentine Primera División. He remained for half of 2016–17, but didn't make an appearance after being an unused sub fourteen times.

In January 2017, García was signed permanently by Chilean Primera División side Deportes Antofagasta. He made his debut on 19 February in a 5–0 victory over Universidad de Concepción. On 7 July 2017, after thirteen games for Antofagasta, García returned to Argentina to join Huracán on loan. He appeared three times during the 2017–18 campaign for the club. August 2018 saw García join Racing de Córdoba of Torneo Federal A. He made six appearances. In 2019, García returned to Chile as he agreed terms with Primera B's San Luis. His debut arrived on 23 February versus Deportes Temuco.

After terminating his San Luis contract on 29 July 2019, García spent the rest of the year without a club. In March 2020, Chilean Segunda División outfit Deportes Recoleta signed García. His first appearance, which was delayed due to the COVID-19 pandemic, came in a home defeat to San Antonio Unido on 16 September; it also meant he had appeared in the top three divisions of the country's system.

Personal life
Garcia's twin brother, Santiago, is also a professional footballer.

Career statistics
.

Honours
Rosario Central
Primera B Nacional: 2012–13

References

External links

1988 births
Living people
Footballers from Rosario, Santa Fe
Argentine footballers
Association football goalkeepers
Argentine expatriate footballers
Expatriate footballers in Chile
Argentine expatriate sportspeople in Chile
Primera Nacional players
Argentine Primera División players
Chilean Primera División players
Torneo Federal A players
Primera B de Chile players
Segunda División Profesional de Chile players
Rosario Central footballers
Club de Gimnasia y Esgrima La Plata footballers
C.D. Antofagasta footballers
Club Atlético Huracán footballers
Racing de Córdoba footballers
San Luis de Quillota footballers
Deportes Recoleta footballers